Route 47 is a Connecticut state highway from US 6 in Woodbury to US 202 in Washington, in the western south-central part of the state.

Route description

Route 47 begins at an intersection with U.S. Route 6 in North Woodbury and heads northwestward as Washington Road. It crosses the Nonnewaug River  later, then Route 132 (for Bethlehem) splits off to the north after another  . The road then travels for  through rural northwestern Woodbury and enters the town of Roxbury. Route 47 travels briefly through the northeast corner of Roxbury where it is known as Washington-Woodbury Road. After , Route 47 then enters the town of Washington, becoming Woodbury Road. After another  through rural southern Washington, Route 47 meets with Route 199 in the town center. Continuing north as Green Hill Road for another mile, Route 47 soon crosses the Shepaug River into Washington Depot, where it has a junction with Route 109. Route 47 and Route 109 turn right together on Bee Brook Road as they leave the village. Route 109 splits off to the east (for Morris) about  later while Route 47 heads north. Route 47 re-crosses the Shepaug River in the vicinity of the Bee Brook Rest Area, a picnic area along the highway. The road ends after another  at an intersection with U.S. Route 202 in northern Washington, just east of New Preston.

History 
In October 1803, the Woodbury to Washington road was chartered as a toll road known as the Washington Turnpike. It ran from Woodbury center through Washington center up to the village of New Preston. The turnpike used modern Route 47 from Woodbury to Washington Depot, then used Baldwin Hill Road to reach New Preston. In 1922, most main highways in Connecticut were now managed by the state highway department. The Washington Turnpike alignment had been designated as State Highway 154. The new state highway had a slightly different northern alignment, using Bee Brook Road instead of Baldwin Hill Road. In the 1932 state highway renumbering, old Highway 154 became Route 47. No major changes have occurred since then.

Junction list

References

External links

047
Transportation in Litchfield County, Connecticut